Erdos CTL (sometimes also referred as Shenhua CTL) is a coal liquefaction plant at Ejin Horo Banner in Inner Mongolia, China.

The plant is owned by Shenhua Coal Liquefaction, a subsidiary of Shenhua Group. It uses direct coal liquefaction technology developed by Shenhua Group.  In the first phase, three production lines were installed. The coal liquefaction reactor was manufactured by China First Heavy Industries. Dedicated steel belt cooling systems for a coal slurry solidification were supplied by Sandvik Process Systems.

Construction of the plant started in 2004 and it was commissioned in 2008.  Trial operation started in mid-2009.  Since November 2010, its fully operational.

See also

 Shenhua CTL

References

Petroleum production
Energy infrastructure in China
Synthetic fuel facilities
Coal infrastructure